Tinissa distracta is a moth of the family Tineidae. It was described by Edward Meyrick in 1916. It is found in India.

References

Moths described in 1916
Scardiinae